Sirakovo may refer to the following places:

Bulgaria
Sirakovo, Dobrich Province
Sirakovo, Haskovo Province
Sirakovo, Vratsa Province

Serbia
Sirakovo (Veliko Gradište)